Anna is an extinct town in Crawford County, in the U.S. state of Arkansas.

A post office was established at Anna in 1880, and remained in operation until 1905.

References

Geography of Crawford County, Arkansas
Ghost towns in Arkansas